Bannan (English title: The Ties that Bind)  is a Gaelic-language television series produced by Young Films and first broadcast by BBC Alba in 2014. It tells the story of the return of Màiri MacDonald from Glasgow to the Gaelic-speaking island where she had been brought up, where she comes to terms with the family drama that had caused her to leave eight years earlier. The title, Bannan, is the Gaelic word for "family bonds".

The show was renewed with a contract for additional four years in 2017, according to 'The Scotsman' newspaper. The show aired its eighth and final season in December 2021 with the finale airing on New Years Day 2022.

Cast 
Debbie MacKay as Màiri

Dòl Eoin MacKinnon as Alasdair

Iain MacRae as Tormod

Ali MacLennan as Iain

Alastair MacKay as Donneil

Màiri Morrison as Iseabail

Ellen MacDonald as Ciorstaidh

Ange MacKay as Sarah Jane

Màiri MacLennan as Isla

See also
Gaelic broadcasting in Scotland

References

External links
 IMDb entry

2010s Scottish television series
BBC Scotland television shows
Scottish Gaelic mass media
2014 Scottish television series debuts